Yury Yuryevich Dyupin (born 17 March 1988) is a Russian football goalkeeper. He plays for FC Rubin Kazan.

Club career
He made his debut in the Russian Second Division for FC Dynamo Barnaul on 15 May 2011 in a game against FC Sibiryak Bratsk.

On 13 June 2019, he signed a one-year contract with FC Rubin Kazan.

International career
He was called up to the Russia national football team for the first time in March 2021 for the World Cup qualifiers against Malta, Slovenia and Slovakia.

On 11 May 2021, he was included in the preliminary extended 30-man squad for UEFA Euro 2020. On 2 June 2021, he was included in the final squad. He did not appear in any games as Russia was eliminated at group stage.

Career statistics

Club

References

1988 births
Sportspeople from Barnaul
Living people
Russian footballers
Association football goalkeepers
FC Dynamo Barnaul players
FC Novokuznetsk players
FC SKA-Khabarovsk players
FC Kuban Krasnodar players
FC Anzhi Makhachkala players
FC Rubin Kazan players
Russian Premier League players
Russian First League players
Russian Second League players
UEFA Euro 2020 players